The 2020 United States state legislative elections were held on November 3, 2020, for 86 state legislative chambers in 44 states. Across the fifty states, approximately 65 percent of all upper house seats and 85 percent of all lower house seats were up for election. Nine legislative chambers in the five permanently-inhabited U.S. territories and the federal district of Washington, D.C. also held elections. The elections took place concurrently with several other federal, state, and local elections, including the presidential election, U.S. Senate elections, U.S. House elections, and gubernatorial elections.

Prior to the elections, Democrats held 15 trifectas (control of the governor's office and legislative chambers), Republicans held 21 trifectas, and 14 states have a divided government. Nationwide, Republicans controlled approximately 60 percent of the legislative chambers and 52 percent of the legislative seats. These elections had a major impact on the 2020 redistricting cycle, as many states held their final legislative elections prior to the decennial drawing of new congressional and state legislative districts.

Due to the impact the redistricting cycle will have on partisan control of Congress and state legislatures, the Democrats, who had not been in control of a majority of state legislatures across the U.S. since 2010, had hoped to retake control of key chambers in advance. However, despite fundraising efforts and projections of several Republican-held chambers in competitive states flipping, the Democrats failed to flip any state chambers, which they attributed to gerrymandering in the wake of the 2010 elections, as well as state laws restricting voting, President Donald Trump being on the ballot, and the Democrats' campaigning methods. In fact, Republicans flipped two chambers in the New Hampshire legislature. 

Following the election, Republicans have control of redistricting in 20 state governments, totaling 188 House districts, whereas Democrats have control in states with a total of 73 districts. Overall, these elections saw the fewest partisan changes in state legislatures since 1944.

Summary table

Regularly-scheduled elections were held in 86 of the 99 state legislative chambers in the United States. Nationwide, regularly-scheduled elections were held for 5,876 of the 7,383 legislative seats. Many legislative chambers held elections for all seats, but some legislative chambers that use staggered elections held elections for only a portion of the total seats in the chamber. The chambers not up for election either hold regularly-scheduled elections in odd-numbered years, or have four-year terms and hold all regularly-scheduled elections in presidential midterm election years.

Note that this table only covers regularly-scheduled elections; additional special elections took place concurrently with these regularly-scheduled elections.

Electoral predictions
Louis Jacobson of The Cook Political Report predicted that Republican-held chambers that could potentially flip to Democratic control included both chambers in Arizona, the Florida Senate, both chambers in Georgia, the Iowa House, the Michigan House, the Minnesota Senate, both chambers in North Carolina, both chambers in Pennsylvania, and the Texas House. He predicted that Republicans could potentially gain control of the Maine Senate, the Minnesota House, and both chambers in New Hampshire, all of which were controlled by the Democratic Party. Additionally, Jacobson predicted that Republicans could win control of the Alaska House, which was currently controlled by a coalition of Democrats and Republicans.

Writing for Sabato's Crystal Ball, Chaz Nuttycombe highlighted the Alaska House and the New Hampshire Senate as the top pick-up opportunities for Republicans, and lists the Arizona House, the Arizona Senate, the Iowa House, the Michigan House, the Minnesota Senate, the North Carolina House, the North Carolina Senate, the Pennsylvania House, and the Texas House as the top pick-up opportunities for Democrats.

Most election predictors use:
 "Tossup": No advantage
 "Tilt": Advantage that is not quite as strong as "lean"
 "Lean": Slight advantage
 "Likely": Significant, but surmountable, advantage 
 "Safe" or "Solid": Near-certain chance of victory

State summaries

Alaska

Half of the seats of the Alaska Senate and all of the seats of the Alaska House of Representatives were up for election in 2020. The Alaska Senate is controlled by Republicans, while the Alaska House of Representatives is controlled by a coalition of Democrats, Republicans, and independents. The Alaska House of Representatives is currently the only state legislative chamber controlled by a cross-partisan coalition.

Arizona

All of the seats of the Arizona Senate and the Arizona House of Representatives were up for election in 2020. Republicans have a government trifecta with control of the governorship and both state legislative chambers.

Arkansas

Half of the seats of the Arkansas Senate and all of the seats of the Arkansas House of Representatives were up for election in 2020. Republicans held control of both chambers, maintaining a government trifecta.

California

Half of the seats of the California State Senate and all of the seats of the California State Assembly were up for election in 2020. Democrats held control of both chambers, maintaining a government trifecta.

Colorado

Half of the seats of the Colorado Senate and all of the seats of the Colorado House of Representatives were up for election in 2020. Democrats held control of both chambers, maintaining a government trifecta.

Connecticut

All of the seats of the Connecticut State Senate and the Connecticut House of Representatives were up for election in 2020. Democrats held control of both chambers, maintaining a government trifecta.

Delaware

Half of the seats of the Delaware Senate and all of the seats of the Delaware House of Representatives were up for election in 2020. Democrats held control of both chambers, maintaining a government trifecta.

Florida

Half of the seats of the Florida Senate and all of the seats of the Florida House of Representatives were up for election in 2020. Republicans held control of both chambers, maintaining a government trifecta.

Georgia

All of the seats of the Georgia State Senate and the Georgia House of Representatives were up for election in 2020. Republicans held control of both chambers, maintaining a government trifecta.

Hawaii

Half of the seats of the Hawaii Senate and all of the seats of the Hawaii House of Representatives were up for election in 2020. Democrats held control of both chambers, maintaining a government trifecta.

Idaho

All of the seats of the Idaho Senate and the Idaho House of Representatives were up for election in 2020. Republicans held control of both chambers, maintaining a government trifecta.

Illinois

One third of the seats of the Illinois Senate and all of the seats of the Illinois House of Representatives were up for election in 2020. Democrats held control of both chambers, maintaining a government trifecta.

Indiana

Half of the seats of the Indiana Senate and all of the seats of the Indiana House of Representatives were up for election in 2020. Republicans held control of both chambers, maintaining a government trifecta.

Iowa

Half of the seats of the Iowa Senate and all of the seats of the Iowa House of Representatives were up for election in 2020. Republicans held control of both chambers, maintaining a government trifecta.

Kansas

All of the seats of the Kansas Senate and the Kansas House of Representatives were up for election in 2020. Republicans held control of both chambers.

Kentucky

Half of the seats of the Kentucky Senate and all of the seats of the Kentucky House of Representatives were up for election in 2020. Republicans held control of both chambers. Because the Kentucky legislature can override gubernatorial vetoes with a simple majority vote, Republicans have a veto-proof majority in the state legislature.

Maine

All of the seats of the Maine Senate and the Maine House of Representatives were up for election in 2020. Democrats held control of both chambers, maintaining a government trifecta.

Massachusetts

All of the seats of the Massachusetts Senate and the Massachusetts House of Representatives were up for election in 2020. Democrats retained control of both chambers.

Michigan

All of the seats of the Michigan House of Representatives were up for election in 2020. The Michigan Senate did not hold regularly scheduled elections in 2020. Republicans maintained control of the chamber.

Minnesota

All of the seats of the Minnesota Senate and the Minnesota House of Representatives were up for election in 2020. Republicans maintained control of the senate, while Democrats maintained control of the house of representatives.

Missouri

Half of the seats of the Missouri Senate and all of the seats of the Missouri House of Representatives were up for election in 2020. Republicans held control of both chambers, maintaining a government trifecta.

Montana

Half of the seats of the Montana Senate and all of the seats of the Montana House of Representatives were up for election in 2020. Republicans held control of both chambers, and also gained a government trifecta by winning the gubernatorial election.

Nebraska

Nebraska is the only U.S. state with a unicameral legislature; half of the seats of the Nebraska Legislature were up for election in 2020. Nebraska is also unique in that its legislature is officially non-partisan and holds non-partisan elections, although the Democratic and Republican parties each endorse legislative candidates.

Nevada

Half of the seats of the Nevada Senate and all of the seats of the Nevada Assembly were up for election in 2020. Democrats held control of both chambers, maintaining a government trifecta.

New Hampshire

All of the seats of the New Hampshire Senate and the New Hampshire House of Representatives were up for election in 2020. Republicans gained control of both chambers, establishing a government trifecta.

New Mexico

All of the seats of the New Mexico Senate and the New Mexico House of Representatives were up for election in 2020. Democrats held control of both chambers, maintaining a government trifecta.

New York

All of the seats of the New York State Senate and the New York State Assembly were up for election in 2020. Democrats held control of both chambers, maintaining a government trifecta.

North Carolina

All of the seats of the North Carolina Senate and the North Carolina House of Representatives were up for election in 2020. Republicans retained control of both chambers.

North Dakota

Half of the seats of the North Dakota Senate and the North Dakota House of Representatives were up for election in 2020. Republicans retained control of both chambers, maintaining a government trifecta.

Ohio

Half of the seats of the Ohio Senate and all of the seats of the Ohio House of Representatives were up for election in 2020. Republicans retained control of both chambers, maintaining a government trifecta.

Oklahoma

Half of the seats of the Oklahoma Senate and all of the seats of the Oklahoma House of Representatives were up for election in 2020. Republicans retained control of both chambers, maintaining a government trifecta.

Oregon

Half of the seats of the Oregon State Senate and all of the seats of the Oregon House of Representatives were up for election in 2020. Democrats retained control of both chambers, maintaining a government trifecta.

Pennsylvania

Half of the seats of the Pennsylvania State Senate and all of the seats of the Pennsylvania House of Representatives were up for election in 2020. Republicans retained control of both chambers.

Rhode Island

All of the seats of the Rhode Island Senate and the Rhode Island House of Representatives were up for election in 2020. Democrats retained control of both chambers, maintaining a government trifecta.

South Carolina

All of the seats of the South Carolina Senate and the South Carolina House of Representatives were up for election in 2020. Republicans retained control of both chambers, maintaining a government trifecta.

South Dakota

All of the seats of the South Dakota Senate and the South Dakota House of Representatives were up for election in 2020. Republicans retained control of both chambers, maintaining a government trifecta.

Tennessee

Half of the seats of the Tennessee Senate and all of the seats of the Tennessee House of Representatives were up for election in 2020. Republicans retained control of both chambers, maintaining a government trifecta.

Texas

Half of the seats of the Texas Senate and all of the seats of the Texas House of Representatives were up for election in 2020. Republicans retained control of both chambers, maintaining a government trifecta.

Utah

Half of the seats of the Utah State Senate and all of the seats of the Utah House of Representatives were up for election in 2020. Republicans retained control of both chambers, maintaining a government trifecta.

Vermont

All of the seats of the Vermont Senate and the Vermont House of Representatives were up for election in 2020. Democrats retained control of both chambers.

Washington

Half of the seats of the Washington State Senate and all of the seats of the Washington House of Representatives were up for election in 2020. Democrats retained control of both chambers, maintaining a government trifecta.

West Virginia

Half of the seats of the West Virginia Senate and all of the seats of the West Virginia House of Delegates were up for election in 2020. Republicans retained control of both chambers, maintaining a government trifecta.

Wisconsin

Half of the seats of the Wisconsin Senate and all of the seats of the Wisconsin State Assembly were up for election in 2020. Republicans retained control of both chambers.

Wyoming

Half of the seats of the Wyoming Senate and all of the seats of the Wyoming House of Representatives were up for election in 2020. Republicans retained control of both chambers, maintaining a government trifecta.

Territorial and federal district summaries

American Samoa

All of the seats of the American Samoa Senate and the American Samoa House of Representatives were up for election. Members of the senate serve four-year terms, while members of the house of representative serve two-year terms. Gubernatorial and legislative elections are conducted on a nonpartisan basis in American Samoa.

Guam

All of the seats of the unicameral Legislature of Guam were up for election. All members of the legislature serve a two-year term. Democrats retained control of the legislature.

Northern Mariana Islands
A portion of the seats of the Northern Mariana Islands Senate, and all of the seats of the Northern Mariana Islands House of Representatives, were up for election. Members of the senate serve either four-year terms, while members of the house serve two-year terms. Republicans maintained control of the upper house, but the House was evenly split with one independent caucusing with the nine Republicans and two independents caucusing with the eight Democrats. Control of the chamber was secured for the Democratic-led caucus when one Republican crossed party lines to elect Democrat-aligned Independent Edmund Villagomez as Speaker of the House.

Puerto Rico

All of the seats of the Senate of Puerto Rico and the House of Representatives of Puerto Rico are up for election in 2020. Members of the Senate and the House of Representatives both serve four-year terms. The New Progressive Party lost control of both chambers, although the Popular Democratic Party only managed to gain majority control in the House due to the number of third-party candidates elected.

U.S. Virgin Islands
All of the seats of the unicameral Legislature of the Virgin Islands were up for election in 2020. All members of the legislature serve a two-year term. Democrats retained control of the legislature.

Washington, D.C.

The Council of the District of Columbia serves as the legislative branch of the federal district of Washington, D.C. Half of the council seats are up for election in 2020. Council members serve four-year terms. Democrats retained supermajority control of the council.

Special elections
Various states held special elections for legislative districts throughout the year. Overall, Democrats flipped a total of five seats in Massachusetts, New Hampshire, Oregon, and South Carolina.

Alabama

One special election was held for the Alabama Legislature in 2020.
 House District 49: Republican Russell Bedsole was elected on November 17, 2020, to succeed Republican April Weaver, who resigned on May 12, 2020, to become a regional director for the U.S. Department of Health and Human Services.

Alaska

One special election was held for the Alaska Legislature in 2020.
 Senate District M: Republican Josh Revak was elected on November 3, 2020, after he was appointed by Governor Mike Dunleavy on September 27, 2019, to succeed Republican Chris Birch, who died on August 7, 2019, due to aortic dissection.

Arkansas
Three special elections were held for the Arkansas General Assembly in 2020.
 House District 22: Republican Richard McGrew was elected on March 3, 2020, to succeed Republican Mickey Gates, who was removed from office on October 11, 2019, after he was charged with failure to pay taxes for several years.
 House District 34: Democrat Joy Springer was elected on March 3, 2020, to succeed Democrat John Walker, who died on October 28, 2019.
 House District 96: Republican Jill Bryant was elected on November 3, 2020, to succeed Republican Grant Hodges, who resigned on July 10, 2020, to take a job with Northwest Arkansas Community College.

California

One special election was held for the California State Legislature in 2020.
 Senate District 28: Republican Melissa Melendez was elected on May 12, 2020, to succeed Republican Jeff Stone, who resigned on November 1, 2019, after he was appointed Western Regional Director of the U.S. Department of Labor by President Donald Trump.

Connecticut
Three special elections were held for the Connecticut General Assembly in 2020.
 House District 48: Democrat Brian Smith was elected on January 14, 2020 to succeed Democrat Linda Orange, who died on November 20, 2019, of pancreatic cancer.
 House District 132: Republican Brian Farnen was elected on January 14, 2020 to succeed Republican Brenda Kupchick, who resigned on November 22, 2019, after she was elected First Selectwoman of Fairfield.
 House District 151: Republican Harry Arora was elected on January 21, 2020 to succeed Republican Fred Camillo, who resigned on December 2, 2019, after he was elected First Selectman of Greenwich.

Florida
One special election was held for the Florida Legislature in 2020.
 Senate District 20: Republican Danny Burgess was elected on November 3, 2020, to succeed Republican Tom Lee, who resigned on November 3, 2020, to run for local office.

Georgia
Four special elections were held for the Georgia General Assembly in 2020.
 Senate District 4: Republican Billy Hickman was elected on August 11, 2020, to succeed Republican Jack Hill, who died on April 6, 2020.
 Senate District 13: Republican Carden Summers was elected on March 3, 2020, to succeed Republican Greg Kirk, who died on December 22, 2019, of cholangiocarcinoma.
 Senate District 39: Democrat Sonya Halpern was elected on December 1, 2020, to succeed Democrat Nikema Williams, who resigned on January 3, 2021 after she was elected to the U.S. House of Representatives.
 House District 171: Republican Joe Campbell was elected on January 28, 2020 to succeed Republican Jay Powell, who died on November 25, 2019.

Hawaii

One special election was held for the Hawaii State Legislature in 2020.
 Senate District 16: Democrat Bennette Misalucha was elected on November 3, 2020, to succeed Democrat Breene Harimoto, who died on June 18, 2020, of pancreatic cancer.

Illinois
Two special elections were held for the Illinois General Assembly in 2020.
 Senate District 6: Democrat Sara Feigenholtz was elected on November 3, 2020, after she was appointed by Governor J. B. Pritzker on January 21, 2020, to succeed Democrat John Cullerton, who resigned on January 20, 2020.
 Senate District 11: Democrat Celina Villanueva was elected on November 3, 2020, after she was appointed by Governor J. B. Pritzker on January 7, 2020, to succeed Democrat Martin Sandoval, who resigned on January 1, 2020 amid a corruption scandal.

Kentucky
Four special elections were held for the Kentucky General Assembly in 2020.
 Senate District 26: Democrat Karen Berg was elected on June 23, 2020, to succeed Republican Ernie Harris, who resigned on April 15, 2020.
 Senate District 38: Republican Mike Nemes was elected on January 14, 2020 to succeed Republican Dan Seum, who resigned on November 16, 2019.
 House District 67: Democrat Rachel Roberts was elected on February 25, 2020, to succeed Democrat Dennis Keene, who resigned on December 16, 2019, to become Kentucky Commissioner of Local Government.
 House District 99: Republican Richard White was elected on February 25, 2020, to succeed Democrat Rocky Adkins, who resigned on December 10, 2019, to become senior advisor to Governor Andy Beshear.

Louisiana

One special election was held for the Louisiana State Legislature in 2020.
 House District 54: Republican Joseph Orgeron was elected on July 11, 2020, to succeed Republican Reggie Bagala, who died on April 9, 2020, of COVID-19.

Maine
One special election was held for the Maine Legislature in 2020.
 House District 128: Democrat Kevin O'Connell was elected on March 3, 2020, to succeed Democrat Arthur Verow, who died on December 19, 2019, of a heart attack.

Massachusetts
Five special elections were held for the Massachusetts General Court in 2020. Democrats flipped two seats previously held by Republicans.
 Senate District Hampden and Hampshire 2: Democrat John Velis was elected on May 19, 2020, to succeed Democrat Donald Humason Jr., who resigned on January 5, 2020 after he was elected Mayor of Westfield.
 Senate District Plymouth and Barnstable: Democrat Susan Moran was elected on May 19, 2020, to succeed Republican Vinny deMacedo, who resigned on November 29, 2019, to take a job in higher education.
 House District Bristol 3: Democrat Carol Doherty was elected on June 2, 2020, to succeed Republican Shaunna O'Connell, who resigned on January 6, 2020 after he was elected Mayor of Taunton.
 House District Middlesex 32: Democrat Kate Lipper-Garabedian was elected on March 3, 2020, to succeed Democrat Paul A. Brodeur, who resigned on November 15, 2019, after he was elected Mayor of Melrose.
 House District Middlesex 37: Democrat Danillo Sena was elected on June 2, 2020, to succeed Democrat Jennifer Benson, who resigned on January 8, 2020 to become President of Alliance for Business Leadership.

Michigan

Two special elections were held for the Michigan Legislature in 2020.
 House District 4: Democrat Abraham Aiyash was elected on November 3, 2020, to succeed Democrat Isaac Robinson, who died on March 29, 2020, from breathing problems.
 House District 34: Democrat Cynthia Neeley was elected on March 10, 2020, to succeed Democrat Sheldon Neeley, who resigned on November 11, 2019, after he was elected Mayor of Flint.

Minnesota

Two special elections were held for the Minnesota Legislature in 2020.
 House District 30A: Republican Paul Novotny was elected on February 4, 2020, to succeed Republican Nick Zerwas, who resigned on December 6, 2019, citing medical reasons.
 House District 60A: Democrat Sydney Jordan was elected on February 4, 2020, to succeed Democrat Diane Loeffler, who died on November 16, 2019, of cancer.

Mississippi
Six special elections were held for the Mississippi Legislature in 2020.
 Senate District 15: Republican Bart Williams was elected on October 13, 2020, to succeed Republican Gary Jackson, who resigned on June 30, 2020, due to health reasons.
 Senate District 39: Republican Jason Barrett was elected on October 13, 2020, to succeed Republican Sally Doty, who resigned on July 16, 2020, after she was appointed executive director of the Mississippi Public Utilities Staff by Governor Tate Reeves.
 House District 37: Republican Lynn Wright was elected on October 13, 2020, to succeed Republican Gary Chism, who resigned on June 30, 2020.
 House District 66: Democrat De'Keither Stamps was elected on October 13, 2020, to succeed Democrat Jarvis Dortch, who resigned on July 2, 2020, to become executive director of the Mississippi American Civil Liberties Union.
 House District 87: Republican Joseph Tubb was elected on November 24, 2020, to succeed Republican William Andrews III, who resigned on March 31, 2020.
 House District 88: Republican Robin Robinson was elected on June 23, 2020, to succeed Republican Ramona Blackledge, who resigned on January 31, 2020.

New Hampshire
One special election was held for the New Hampshire General Court in 2020. Democrats flipped one seat previously held by a Republican.
 House District Merrimack 24: Democrat Kathleen Martins was elected on March 10, 2020, to succeed Republican Dick Marple, who died on December 13, 2019.

New Jersey
Two special elections were held for the New Jersey Legislature in 2020.
 Senate District 25: Republican Anthony M. Bucco was elected on November 3, 2020, after he was appointed by the New Jersey Republican State Committee on October 24, 2019, to succeed Republican Anthony R. Bucco, who died on September 16, 2019, of a heart attack.
 Assembly District 25: Republican Aura K. Dunn was elected on November 3, 2020, after she was appointed by the New Jersey Republican State Committee on November 25, 2019, to succeed Republican Anthony M. Bucco, who resigned on October 24, 2019, after he was appointed to the New Jersey Senate.

Oklahoma

One special election was held for the Oklahoma Legislature in 2020.
 Senate District 28: Republican Zack Taylor was elected on June 30, 2020, to succeed Republican Jason Smalley, who resigned on January 31, 2020 to take a private sector job with Motorola Solutions.

Oregon

One special election was held for the Oregon Legislative Assembly in 2020. Democrats flipped one seat previously held by a Republican.
 Senate District 10: Democrat Deb Patterson defeated Republican appointee Denyc Boles on November 3, 2020, to succeed Republican Jackie Winters, who died on May 29, 2019, of lung cancer.

Pennsylvania

Five special elections were held for the Pennsylvania General Assembly in 2020.
 Senate District 48: Republican Dave Arnold was elected on January 14, 2020 to succeed Republican Mike Folmer, who resigned on September 18, 2019, after he was charged with possession of child pornography.
 House District 8: Republican Tim Bonner was elected on March 17, 2020, to succeed Republican Tedd Nesbit, who resigned on January 2, 2020 to join the Pennsylvania courts of common pleas from Mercer County.
 House District 18: Republican K.C. Tomlinson was elected on March 17, 2020, to succeed Republican Gene DiGirolamo, who resigned on January 6, 2020 after he was elected to the Bucks County Board of Commissioners.
 House District 58: Republican Eric Davanzo was elected on March 17, 2020, to succeed Republican Justin Walsh, who resigned on December 26, 2019, after he was elected Westmoreland County judge.
 House District 190: Democrat G. Roni Green was elected on February 25, 2020, to succeed Democrat Movita Johnson-Harrell, who resigned on December 13, 2019, after she was charged with theft, perjury, and tampering with public records.

Rhode Island
One special election was held for the Rhode Island General Assembly in 2020.
 House District 56: Democrat Joshua Giraldo was elected on March 3, 2020, to succeed Democrat Shelby Maldonado, who resigned on December 16, 2019.

South Carolina
Two special elections were held for the South Carolina General Assembly in 2020. Democrats flipped one seat previously held by a Republican.
 House District 107: Republican Case Brittain was elected on November 3, 2020, to succeed Republican Alan D. Clemmons, who resigned on July 17, 2020, to practice law.
 House District 115: Democrat Spencer Wetmore was elected on August 11, 2020, to succeed Republican Peter M. McCoy Jr., who resigned on March 30, 2020, to become interim U.S. Attorney for the District of South Carolina.

Texas

Five special elections were held for the Texas Legislature in 2020.
 Senate District 14: Democrat Sarah Eckhardt was elected on July 14, 2020, to succeed Democrat Kirk Watson, who resigned on April 30, 2020, to become the dean of the University of Houston's Hobby School of Public Affairs.
 Senate District 30: Republican Drew Springer was elected on December 19, 2020, to succeed Republican Pat Fallon, who resigned on January 3, 2021 after he was elected to the U.S. House of Representatives.
 House District 28: Republican Gary Gates was elected on January 28, 2020 to succeed Republican John Zerwas, who resigned on September 30, 2019, after he joined the University of Texas System.
 House District 100: Democrat Lorraine Birabil was elected on January 28, 2020 to succeed Democrat Eric Johnson, who resigned on June 17, 2019, after he was elected Mayor of Dallas.
 House District 148: Democrat Anna Eastman was elected on January 28, 2020 to succeed Democrat Jessica Farrar, who resigned on September 30, 2019.

Virginia
One special election was held for the Virginia General Assembly in 2020.
 House District 29: Republican Bill Wiley was elected on November 3, 2020, to succeed Republican Chris Collins, who resigned on June 28, 2020, after he was appointed to the Virginia General District Court.

Washington
One special election was held for the Washington State Legislature in 2020.
 Senate District 38: Democrat June Robinson was elected on November 3, 2020, after she was appointed by the Snohomish County Council on May 13, 2020, to succeed Democrat John McCoy, who resigned on April 17, 2020, citing health reasons.

Table of partisan control

Prior to the 2020 elections, Republicans controlled approximately 60 percent of the state legislative chambers and 52 percent of the state legislative seats in the United States. Nationwide, approximately 40 percent of the population of the United States (including federal districts and territories) lived in states with Republican control of the state government, 37 percent lived in states with Democratic control, and 22 percent lived in states with divided government.

This table shows the partisan control of governor's offices and state legislative chambers in each state. In situations where one party controls the governor's office and both legislative chambers (known as a "government trifecta"), that party is marked as having "overall" control of the state. Otherwise, overall control of the state is marked as being divided.

See also
2020 United States presidential election
2020 United States Senate elections
2020 United States House of Representatives elections
2020 United States gubernatorial elections

Notes

References

 
State legislative elections
State legislature elections in the United States by year